Lying is the practice of telling lies, or deliberate untruths.

Lying may also refer to:

 Lying (position), a human horizontal position
 Lying (Bok book), a 1978 book by Sissela Bok
 Lying (Harris book), a 2011 book by Sam Harris
 Lying (film), a 2006 American film
 "Lying" (Amy Meredith song), 2010
 "Lying", a song by Lil Baby and Lil Durk from The Voice of the Heroes, 2021
 "Lying", a song by Peter Frampton from Premonition, 1986
 "Lying", a song by PrettyMuch, 2019

See also 
 Lied (disambiguation)
 Lying in (disambiguation)